Kasenengwa District is a district of Eastern Province, Zambia. It was made independent from Chipata District in 2018.

References 

Districts of Eastern Province, Zambia